This is a list of members of the first Legislature of the Congress of Deputies of Spain. They were elected in the 1979 elections.

References

01
1979 in Spain